Gvaladze or more correct Ghvaladze is a Georgian family name which is – apart from the capital Tbilisi – most frequently found in the central Imereti and Shida Kartli and the eastern Kakheti regions of Georgia. Most Ghvaladzes live in the Tbilisi (239), Chiatura (224), Kareli (104) and Lagodekhi (86) districts.

Notable members 
Evgen Gvaladze (1900–1937), Georgian lawyer, journalist and politician
Guranda Gvaladze (born 1932), Georgian botanist
Varlam Ghvaladze (1893–1944), Georgian biochemist and teacher

References 

Georgian-language surnames